Nataliya Anatoliyivna Davydova (born 22 July 1985 in Sherlovaya Gora, Chita Oblast, Russian SFSR, Soviet Union) is a Ukrainian weightlifter.

Career
She won the bronze medal in the 69 kg category at the 2005 Junior World Championships, with a total of 233 kg.

At the 2005 World Weightlifting Championships she ranked 7th in the 69 kg category, and at the 2006 World Weightlifting Championships she ranked 4th in the same category, lifting a total of 237 kg.

Davydova won bronze medal at the 2007 World Weightlifting Championships in the 69 kg category, with a total of 244 kg.

At the 2008 Summer Olympics she was initially awarded the bronze medal in the 69 kg category, with a total of 250 kg. On 17 November 2016 the IOC disqualified Davydova from the 2008 Olympic Games, stripped her Olympic medal and struck her results from the record for failing a drugs test in a re-analysis of her doping sample from 2008.

Notes and references

External links
  at beijing2008

1985 births
Living people
People from Borzinsky District
Ukrainian people of Russian descent
Ukrainian female weightlifters
Olympic weightlifters of Ukraine
Weightlifters at the 2008 Summer Olympics
Competitors stripped of Summer Olympics medals
Doping cases in weightlifting
Ukrainian sportspeople in doping cases
European Weightlifting Championships medalists
World Weightlifting Championships medalists
20th-century Ukrainian people
21st-century Ukrainian people